Ceinture 5001 to 5012 were a class of 2-10-2T tank locomotives of the Syndicat d'Exploitation des Chemins de fer de Ceinture de Paris. They were used for hauling freight trains on the Grande Ceinture line in Paris, and later the Région Nord.

The locomotives were designed jointly by the firm of Corpet-Louvet and Henschel & Sohn, and were based on the Prussian T 20. They were delivered to the Ceinture between 1928 and 1930, who numbered them 5001 to 5012. 

In 1934, at the dissolution of the Syndicat, they transferred to the Chemins de fer du Nord who renumbered them 5.301 to 5.312.

In 1938, at the creation of the SNCF, the became 2-151.TA.1 to 2-151.TA.12.

They were retired between 1962 and 1965. None have been preserved.

References

See also
List of Chemins de Fer du Nord locomotives

Steam locomotives of France
2-10-2T locomotives
Railway locomotives introduced in 1928
Corpet-Louvet locomotives

Freight locomotives 
Scrapped locomotives